{{DISPLAYTITLE:Phi2 Cancri}}

Phi2 Cancri (φ2 Cancri) is a binary star in the constellation Cancer, about 280 light-years from Earth. Both components are white A-type main-sequence dwarfs with apparent magnitudes of +6.3. They are separated by 5.126 arcseconds on the sky, and their mean apparent brightness is +5.55 magnitudes.

References

A-type main-sequence stars
Binary stars
Cancri, Phi2
Cancer (constellation)
Durchmusterung objects
Cancri, 23
041404
71150/1
3310/11